Jerry Springer (born 1944) is an American television presenter.

Jerry Springer may also refer to:

 Jerry Springer, a tabloid talk show presented by Springer
 Jerry Springer: The Opera, a British musical inspired by the talk show
 "Jerry Springer", a song from "Weird Al" Yankovic's 1999 album Running with Scissors